Patriarch Theodore of Alexandria may refer to:

 Patriarch Theodore I of Alexandria, Greek Patriarch of Alexandria in 607–609
 Patriarch Theodore II of Alexandria (Coadjutor), Greek Patriarch of Alexandria between the 7th and 8th centuries
 Patriarch Theodore II of Alexandria, Greek Patriarch of Alexandria since 2004